Qaradağ (also, Karadag) is a village and municipality in the Gadabay Rayon of Azerbaijan.  It has a population of 1,318.  The municipality consists of the villages of Qaradağ and Daşbulaq (formerly, Qorelsk).

References 

Populated places in Gadabay District